Barbara Anne Macdonald (nee Charles, September 11, 1913 – June 15, 2000) was an American social worker and lesbian feminist activist. She is best known for her activism against ageism.

Early life and career 
She Barbara Charles was born in Pomona, California and grew up in La Habra, California. When she was 15, she left home and began to support herself as a domestic worker in Long Beach, California. She attended Long Beach Junior College from 1931-1932 and Santa Ana Junior College from 1932-1937. She was nearly expelled from Santa Ana Junior College for being a lesbian. She later attended University of California, Berkeley, from 1938-1940 where she supported herself as a stunt parachute jumper.

After graduating from Berkeley, she had a job at the WPA Vallejo Housing Authority. She later attended the University of Washington from 1950-1953 where she received her bachelors and a masters of social work. She moved to Wenatchee, Washington, where she was a supervisor in Child Welfare Services. Macdonald would work as a social worker until she retired in 1974.

Macdonald was invited to talk at many different organizations throughout her life, including universities, social worker organizations and to "lesbian and feminist audiences." She was also invited to speak on international panels at the Non-governmental Organizations (NGO) forum at the 1995 United Nations World Conference on Women in Beijing.

Activism against ageism

Macdonald began to think about aging in the late 1970s. When she was at a march in New England in 1978, she began to fall behind. The marshal of the parade noted her age and told her to move to another part of the line because she couldn't keep up. The incident taught Macdonald not to put her pride in strength because, as people age, they become weaker. Instead of feeling ashamed of her physical weakness, Macdonald decided to fight against ageism.

Macdonald saw ageism as a "central feminist issue" and made it the core of her activism. Macdonald felt that ageism divided women.  She identified many aspects of age-related issues that affect older women, such as poverty, physical challenges caused by age, violence against older women, and health issues, all of which she felt were not adequately addressed by younger feminists. Macdonald felt that defining women by their familial roles was the central contributor to ageism. She felt that older women tend to be seen as caretakers and mother-figures instead of as individuals.

In 1983, Macdonald and her partner, Cynthia Rich, published Look Me in the Eye: Women, Aging and Ageism. The book was considered "extremely rare" by May Sarton and called "courageous" by Robin Morgan. In 1987, the book inspired the formation of the group Old Lesbians Organizing for Change.

After four years of lobbying to get the topic included at a Women's Studies conference, Macdonald gave a pivotal speech at a national conference in 1985, emphasizing ageism as an important feminist issue and speaking about old women being denied humanity and reduced to stereotypes.

Personal life
From 1930 to 1935, she was married to Elmo Davis. In 1941, she was very briefly married to John Macdonald. She adopted her husband's family name and used it throughout her life. In 1974, Macdonald  met Cynthia Rich, who was teaching a feminist workshop that Macdonald attended. Rich and Macdonald became a couple and stayed together for twenty-six years.

Macdonald suffered from "debilitating memory loss" in the last four years of her life. She died of Alzheimer's disease on June 15, 2000.

Bibliography

References

External links 
 A Movement of Old Lesbians (1987) by Barbara Macdonald
 Guide to the Barbara Macdonald papers, 1979-2003

American feminist writers
Elder rights activists
American women's rights activists
American lesbian writers
American LGBT rights activists
LGBT people from California
Lesbian feminists
University of California, Berkeley alumni
1913 births
2000 deaths
People from Pomona, California
University of Washington School of Social Work alumni
American social workers
20th-century American women writers
20th-century American non-fiction writers
Activists from California
20th-century American LGBT people